Edgar Lin Chun-yi (born 23 July 1938) is a Taiwanese biologist, environmentalist, diplomat and politician.

Early life and career
Lin studied English at National Taiwan University and earned a Ph.D. in ecology from the University of Indiana. He remained in the United States for a time, working as a research fellow for the House of Representatives Committee on Science, Space and Technology.

After his return to Taiwan, Lin taught at Tunghai University. Lin began participating in Taiwan's environmental movement in the 1980s. He became known as a "godfather" of the cause and was a noted anti-nuclear activist, later serving Greenpeace Taiwan as its president.

Political career
Lin ran in the 1989 legislative election for a Legislative Yuan seat in Taichung. His unsuccessful campaign was backed by the Democratic Progressive Party. He was elected to the National Assembly in 1992. The National Assembly voted to block a set of reform proposals after its convocation. Alongside fellow DPP members Huang Hsin-chieh and Chen Yung-hsing, Lin walked out of the assembly on 4 May 1992, criticizing the body for procedural violations. In September 1993, Lin accepted the DPP nomination as its candidate for the Taichung mayoralty.

Lin led Taipei's  while Chen Shui-bian was mayor. Chen was elected president in 2000, and Lin was appointed minister of the Environmental Protection Administration by Premier Tang Fei in April, taking office with the rest of the cabinet on 20 May. Shortly after joining the EPA, Lin renounced his opposition to nuclear energy, stating that he had held that stance largely to combat totalitarianism. In October, Lin made his first trip to the United States in an official capacity and became the first EPA executive to include environmentalists as part of his contingent abroad. The Amorgos oil spill occurred in January 2001, and the Executive Yuan was criticized for its delayed response. Subsequently, Lin resigned his position in March.

In August of that year, Lin was named ambassador to The Gambia. He served until December 2004, when he was sworn in as Taiwan's representative to the United Kingdom. His first trip in the UK took place the next month. While in the UK, Lin has spoken out against the One China principle, Anti-Secession Law, and one country, two systems. Instead, Lin proposed that the European Union pass its own version of the United States' Taiwan Relations Act.

References

1938 births
Living people
Taiwanese environmentalists
Taiwanese anti–nuclear power activists
Representatives of Taiwan to the United Kingdom
Democratic Progressive Party (Taiwan) politicians
Writers from Taipei
Politicians of the Republic of China on Taiwan from Taipei
National Taiwan University alumni
Indiana University alumni
Academic staff of Tunghai University
Taiwanese biologists
People associated with Greenpeace
Ambassadors to the Gambia
Taiwanese Ministers of Environment
Ambassadors of the Republic of China